Three naval vessels of Japan have been named Makigumo (巻雲), meaning "Cirrus Clouds" (Rolling Clouds).

Originally, she was a  torpedo cruiser Vsadnik of the Imperial Russian Navy.
She was completed in 1942, scuttled in 1943, and struck in 1943.
She was launched in 1967 and decommissioned in 1995.

Imperial Japanese Navy ship names
Japanese Navy ship names